Dodonaea camfieldii is a species of plant in the family Sapindaceae and is  endemic to New South Wales. It is a small plant with single or paired flowers and mostly simple leaves.

Description

Taxonomy and naming
Dodonaea camfieldii was first formally described in 1897 by Joseph Maiden and Daniel Ludwig Ernst Betche and the description was published in Proceedings of the Linnean Society of New South Wales.The specific epithet (camfieldii) was named in honour of Mr. Camfield a botanical collector.

Distribution and habitat
This species of dodonaea grows mostly on sandstone in dry sclerophyll forest from Jervis Bay to the Hawkesbury local government area.

References

camfieldii
Endemic flora of Australia
Sapindales of Australia